

Tivendale is a suburb in the Northern Territory of Australia located in Darwin about  east of Darwin City.

Tivendale consists of land bounded partly by the Tiger Brennan Drive in the north and the Adelaide-Darwin Railway in the north-east and the east, and partly in the south by the Hudson Creek.  
The name is derived from a nearby road called Tivendale Road which is itself named after Lyle Mason Tivendale, a Northern Territory resident who worked as a stock and meat inspector and as a health inspector during the first half of the twentieth century.  The suburb’s boundary and name were gazetted on 21 April 2004.

The 2016 Australian census which was conducted in August 2016 reports that Tivendale had no people living within its boundaries.

Tivendale is located within the federal division of Solomon, the territory electoral division of Spillett and the unincorporated area known as the Northern Territory Rates Act Area.

See also
List of Darwin suburbs

References

Suburbs of Darwin, Northern Territory
Places in the unincorporated areas of the Northern Territory